Leo Lösch von Hilkertshausen (died 8 April 1559) was the 49th Bishop of Freising in 1552 to 1559.

Leo came from Hilgertshausen, near Dachau as a member of a noble family. He encouraged, supported by the Bavarian Duke Albrecht V, the counter-reformation in his diocese. During his tenure, the Peace of Augsburg was established.

16th-century Roman Catholic bishops in Bavaria
Roman Catholic Prince-Bishops of Freising
1559 deaths
Year of birth unknown